Jan Iversen (5 June 1916 – 25 August 1999) was a Norwegian politician for the Christian Democratic Party.

He served as a deputy representative in the Norwegian Parliament from Sør-Trøndelag during the term 1973–1977.

On the local level Iversen was mayor of Frøya municipality from 1975 to 1979.

References

1916 births
1999 deaths
Christian Democratic Party (Norway) politicians
Deputy members of the Storting
Mayors of Frøya, Sør-Trøndelag